Devasamudra  is a village in the southern state of Karnataka, India. It is located in the Hospet taluk of Bellary district in Karnataka.

Demographics
 India census, Devasamudra had a population of 6189 with 3074 males and 3115 females.

See also
 Bellary
 Districts of Karnataka
454

References

External links
 http://Bellary.nic.in/

Villages in Bellary district